Hardap may refer to:

 Hardap Region, one of the thirteen regions of Namibia
 Hardap Dam, the largest dam in Namibia